National Highway 127C, commonly called NH 127C is a national highway in  India. It is a spur road of National Highway 27.  NH-127C traverses the state of Assam in India. This highway is located in Chirang district of Assam.

Route 
Shyamthai - Hithijhar -  Indo/Bhutan border near Galegphu in Bhutan.

Junctions  

  Terminal near Shymthai.

See also 
 List of National Highways in India
 List of National Highways in India by state

References

External links 

 NH 127C on OpenStreetMap

National highways in India
National Highways in Assam